James E. Allen may refer to:

 James E. Allen Jr. (1911–1971), Commissioner of Education of the State of New York
 James E. Allen (artist) (1894–1964), American illustrator, printmaker, and painter
 Paulie Gilmore (James E. Allen), American professional wrestler and promoter